Incorporated is a mash-up album made by the mash-up band the Legion of Doom.

History
The album was recorded in 2005. Initially, the band released the songs "I Know What You Buried Last Summer", "Dottie in a Car Crash" and "The Quiet Screaming" on their website for free download. After several delays due to several bands not wanting their music released in mashup form, the group leaked the album online through several P2P networks. On February 6, 2007, it was announced that the album would be released in physical format through Illegal Art. The CD was released on March 6 of that year.

Track listing

Personnel
Chad Blinman
Trever Keith
Kieron Hilton

References

Mashup albums
2007 remix albums
The Legion of Doom (mash up group) albums
Illegal Art albums